The Killough massacre is believed to have been both the largest and last Native American attack on white settlers in East Texas. The massacre took place on October 5, 1838, near Larissa, Texas, in the northwestern part of Cherokee County. There were eighteen victims, including Isaac Killough, Sr., and his extended family (viz. the families of four sons and two daughters). They had immigrated to the Republic of Texas from Talladega County, Alabama, in 1837.

Context

Apparently unaware that the land made available to them was hotly disputed by the Cherokee Indians who lived in the area, Isaac Killough and his homesteaders began clearing land for crops and building homes. Only a year earlier, however, the area surrounding their settlement had been set aside for the Cherokee under a treaty negotiated and signed by Sam Houston and John Forbes. When the Republic of Texas Senate refused to ratify the treaty and then, in December 1838, formally nullified it, the Cherokee, who already thought they had conceded enough, became homicidal.

The influx of Anglo settlers into lands thought to have been theirs increased Cherokee resentment, and as there was also residual bitterness among some Hispanics still loyal to Mexico, the atmosphere in the region became tense in early 1838. By the summer of that year, there were rumblings of coming insurrection from either or both of those factions, and evidence existed for collusion between them.

Fearing this growing unrest, Killough with his relatives and friends fled to Nacogdoches for refuge. On condition they would leave the area after doing so, the Cherokee leaders agreed to their safe passage if they would return simply to harvest their crops. They did so. But on October 5, 1838, a band of Cherokee who had not been party to the agreement attacked the settlement. Most of the Killough group—a total of eighteen—were  killed or abducted as they worked their fields. Those who survived fled for a time to Lacy's Fort on the San Antonio Road, just west of present-day Alto, Texas.

According to Dallas newspaperman Charles Kilpatrick, several of the men walked into an ambush and the Native Americans then:
"...shot down Isaac, Jr., Allen, Samuel and George Wood, then swept uphill into the little settlement. Isaac, Sr., fell in his front yard and Barakias Williams was killed in front of the screaming women.  Eight settlers, including seven women and children, were seized by warriors and carried into the forest. They were never seen or heard of again...Nathaniel Killough and his wife (and 11-month-old baby girl, Eliza Jane) escaped into a canebrake and Mrs. Samuel Killough, Mrs. Isaac Killough, Sr., Mrs. Isaac Killough, Jr., and the baby William also managed to elude the redskins. Three weary days later the little party staggered into Fort Lacy at Alto, 40 miles south, where they found safety."
A stone obelisk commemorating the event was erected by the Work Progress Administration in the 1930s, and a historical marker was dedicated in 1965.

See also
List of massacres in the United States
Cherokee War of 1839

References

External links 
Killough Massacre Burial Site Cemetery
Killough Reunion Association
Remembering the Killough Massacre, Tyler Morning Telegraph, Kenneth Dean – writer, June 21, 2010.

1838 in the Republic of Texas
Massacres in 1838
Massacres by Native Americans
Texas–Indian Wars
October 1838 events